Yttrium(III) hydroxide is an inorganic compound and an alkali with the chemical formula Y(OH)3.

Production
Yttrium(III) hydroxide can be produced by reacting yttrium(III) nitrate and sodium hydroxide in aqueous solution:

 Y(NO3)3 + 3 NaOH → Y(OH)3↓ + 3 NaNO3

This gives yttrium(III) hydroxide as a white gelatinous precipitate, which can be dried to a white powder.

Chemical properties
Yttrium(III) hydroxide is an alkali, so it can react with acid:
 Y(OH)3 + 3 HNO3 → Y(NO3)3 + 3 H2O

 2 Y(OH)3 + 3 H2SO4 → Y2(SO4)3 + 3 H2O

The compound absorbs atmospheric carbon dioxide.

When heated, yttrium(III) hydroxide will decompose:
 2 Y(OH)3 → Y2O3 + 3 H2O↑

References

Yttrium compounds
Hydroxides